Ichneutica panda is a species of moth in the family Noctuidae. It is endemic to New Zealand and only found in central and southern parts of the South Island. The species has not been collected in Canterbury since the late 1950s and has not been seen at The Wilderness scientific reserve since 1941. This species is similar in appearance to Ichneutica falsidica however I. panda lack or have indistinct black dashes on their edge of their hindwings. I. panda inhabit shrubland from alpine zones down to river terraces and adults are on the wing between December to February. The life history of this species is unknown as is the host species of the larvae.

Taxonomy
This species was first described by Alfred Philpott in 1920 from a male collected by George Hudson at Mount Earnslaw / Pikirakatahi and a female collected by Philpott at Routeburn. Philpott named the species Aletia panda. The male lectotype specimen is held at Museum of New Zealand Te Papa Tongarewa.  The argentaria form of this species was first described by George Howes in 1945 using a specimen collected by him at The Wilderness scientific reserve in Southland under the name Aletia argentaria.

Prior to 2019, the genus level classification of New Zealand endemic moths within the genus Aletia was regarded as unsatisfactory and was due for revision. As such this species has previously been known as Aletia (s.l.) panda as well as Aletia (s.l.) argentaria. In 2019 Robert Hoare undertook a major review of New Zealand Noctuidae. During this review the genus Ichneutica was greatly expanded and the genus Aletia was subsumed into that genus as a synonym. As a result of this review, this species is now known as Ichneutica panda. During this review Hoare also synonymised Aletia argentaria with I. panda.

Description

The original description of this species given by Philpott is as follows:

The argentaria form of this species was described by Howes as follows:  
The argentaria form was regarded by George Hudson as being very similar to Aletia panda, differing only in having narrower forewings, more oblique termen and smaller orbicular stigma. Hoare formally synonymised argentaria with panda as although the argentaria from is smaller and more uniform in colour the wingspan falls within the wingspan range of panda, the genitalia of argentaria specimens show no differences to panda and, although argentaria has a variable forewing pattern, that difference is not sufficient to justify being classified as a separate species.

More strongly marked forms of I. panda can be confused with I. falsidica. However the antennae of male I. panda have shorter pectinations and both the male and female I. panda lack or have unclearly defined dark dash marks on their hindwing termen in comparison to the more vivid marks in specimens of I. falsidica.

Distribution 
This species is endemic to New Zealand. It is only found in the central and southern parts of the South Island. Although this species has been collected in Canterbury, this was over 60 years ago with a specimen collected at Arthur's Pass in 1958 and at Bealey River in 1959. It has also not been recollected at the Wilderness Scientific Reserve since 1941.

Habitat 
The preferred habitat of this species is shrublands in alpine and subalpine zones as well as in river terraces.

Behaviour 
Adults of this species are on the wing between December to February.

Life history and host species 
The life history of this species is unknown as are the host species of its larvae.

References

External links

Image of holotype specimen of Aletia argentaria

Moths of New Zealand
Hadeninae
Endemic fauna of New Zealand
Moths described in 1945
Taxa named by George Howes (entomologist)
Endemic moths of New Zealand